is a former professional Japanese baseball player.

External links

 NPB.com

1975 births
Living people
People from Sagamihara
Japanese expatriate baseball players in Taiwan
Nippon Professional Baseball pitchers
Hiroshima Toyo Carp players
China Times Eagles players
Orix Buffaloes players
Japanese baseball coaches
Nippon Professional Baseball coaches